The 2020 CONMEBOL Recopa Sudamericana was the 28th edition of the CONMEBOL Recopa Sudamericana (also referred to as the Recopa Sudamericana), the football competition organized by CONMEBOL between the winners of the previous season's two major South American club tournaments, the Copa Libertadores and the Copa Sudamericana.

The competition was contested in two-legged home-and-away format between Brazilian team Flamengo, the 2019 Copa Libertadores champions, and Ecuadorian team Independiente del Valle, the 2019 Copa Sudamericana champions. The first leg was hosted by Independiente del Valle at the Estadio Olímpico Atahualpa in Quito on 19 February 2020, while the second leg was hosted by Flamengo on 26 February 2020 at the Maracanã in Rio de Janeiro.

Flamengo won 5–2 on aggregate to claim their first Recopa Sudamericana title.

Teams

Venues

Format
The Recopa Sudamericana was played on a home-and-away two-legged basis, with the Copa Libertadores champions hosting the second leg. If tied on aggregate, the away goals rule would not be used, and 30 minutes of extra time would be played. If still tied after extra time, the penalty shoot-out would be used to determine the winner (Regulations Article 17).

Matches

First leg

Second leg

See also
2019 Copa Libertadores Final
2019 Copa Sudamericana Final

References

External links
CONMEBOL Recopa 2020, CONMEBOL.com 

2020
2020 in South American football
C.S.D. Independiente del Valle matches
CR Flamengo matches
2020 in Brazilian football
2020 in Ecuadorian football
February 2020 sports events in South America